1253 Frisia, provisional designation , is a carbonaceous Themistian asteroid from the outer regions of the asteroid belt, approximately 20 kilometers in diameter. Discovered by Karl Reinmuth at Heidelberg Observatory in 1931, the asteroid was later named after the region of Frisia and the Frisian Islands.

Discovery 

Frisia was discovered on 9 October 1931, by German astronomer Karl Reinmuth at the Heidelberg-Königstuhl State Observatory in southwest Germany. It was independently discovered by Soviet astronomer Pelageya Shajn at the Simeiz Observatory on the Crimean peninsula on 6 November 1931. The body's observation arc begins at Heidelberg eleven days after its official discovery observation.

Orbit and classification 

Frisia is a Themistian asteroid that belongs to the Themis family, a very large family of carbonaceous asteroids, named after 24 Themis. It orbits the Sun in the outer main-belt at a distance of 2.5–3.8 AU once every 5 years and 7 months (2,054 days). Its orbit has an eccentricity of 0.21 and an inclination of 1° with respect to the ecliptic.

Physical characteristics 

Frisia is an assumed carbonaceous C-type asteroid, which corresponds to the overall spectral type of the Themis family.

Rotation period 

In November 2011, a rotational lightcurve of Frisia was obtained by astronomers at the University of North Dakota and the Badlands Observatory in North Dakota, United States. Lightcurve analysis gave a rotation period of 14.557 hours with a brightness variation of 0.16 magnitude. Photometric observations in the R-band at the Palomar Transient Factory in September 2011, gave a somewhat similar period of 18.500 hours and an amplitude of 0.15 magnitude.

Diameter and albedo 

According to the survey carried out by the NEOWISE mission of NASA's Wide-field Infrared Survey Explorer, Frisia measures between 19.09 and 24.00 kilometers in diameter and its surface has an albedo between 0.04 and 0.0839.

The Collaborative Asteroid Lightcurve Link assumes an albedo of 0.08 and calculates a diameter of 18.71 kilometers based on an absolute magnitude of 12.0.

Naming 

This minor planet was named after region of Frisia and its Frisian Islands, located on the southeastern coast of the North Sea. The region is the homeland of the Frisian people and mostly part of the Netherlands but its islands stretch along the coast up to Germany and Denmark. The official naming citation was mentioned in The Names of the Minor Planets by Paul Herget in 1955.

References

External links 
 Asteroid Lightcurve Database (LCDB), query form (info )
 Dictionary of Minor Planet Names, Google books
 Asteroids and comets rotation curves, CdR – Observatoire de Genève, Raoul Behrend
 Discovery Circumstances: Numbered Minor Planets (1)-(5000) – Minor Planet Center
 
 

001253
Discoveries by Karl Wilhelm Reinmuth
Named minor planets
19311009